Old Norse literature refers to the vernacular literature of the Scandinavian peoples up to c. 1350. It chiefly consists of Icelandic writings.

In Britain 
From the 8th to the 15th centuries, Vikings and Norse settlers and their descendants colonised parts of what is now modern Scotland. Some Old Norse poetry survives relating to this period. The Orkneyinga saga (also called the History of the Earls of Orkney) is a historical narrative of the history of the Orkney Islands, from their capture by the Norwegian king in the ninth century onwards until about 1200. 20th-century poet George Mackay Brown was influenced by the saga, notably for his 1973 novel Magnus. The Icelandic Njáls saga includes actions taking place in Orkney and Wales. Besides these Icelandic sagas a few examples, sometimes fragmentary, of Norse poetry composed in Scotland survive. Among the runic inscriptions at Maeshowe is a text identified as irregular verse. Scandinavian cultural contacts in the Danelaw also left legacies in literature. Höfuðlausn or the "Head's Ransom" is a skaldic poem attributed to Egill Skalla-Grímsson in praise of king Eirik Bloodaxe in the Kingdom of Northumbria.

See also

 Edda
 Norse sagas
 Icelanders' sagas
 Kings' sagas
 Legendary sagas
 Old Icelandic Homily Book
 Old Norse poetry
 Scandinavian literature
 Danish literature
 Faroese literature
 Icelandic literature
 Norwegian literature
 Swedish literature

References

Old Norse Prose and Poetry from heimskringla.no

 
Norse